A Yellow Streak is a 1915 American silent Western film directed by William Nigh and starring Lionel Barrymore, Irene Howley and Niles Welch.

Plot 
After a Wall Street broker is ruined by his wife's lover, a business associated, he thinks of committing suicide off Brooklyn Bridge but instead heads to a western mining town.

Cast
 Lionel Barrymore as Barry Dale
 Irene Howley as Mary Austin
 Dorothy Gwynne as Virginia Dale 
 John Goldsworthy as Richard Marvin
 Niles Welch as Tom Austin
 R.A. Bresee as Parke Austin
 William Cowper as Tobias Rader
 William B. Davidson as Jack Rader
 Martin Faust as Outlaw 
 John J. Donough as The Sky Pilot

References

Bibliography
 Langman, Larry. A Guide to Silent Westerns. Greenwood Publishing Group, 1992.
 Nevins, Francis M. & Keller, Gary D. The Cisco Kid: American Hero, Hispanic Roots. Bilingual Press/Editorial Bilingüe, 2008.

External links
 

1915 films
1915 Western (genre) films
1910s English-language films
Films directed by William Nigh
Metro Pictures films
Silent American Western (genre) films
1910s American films